As of March 1 (O.S. February 17), when the Julian calendar acknowledged a leap day and the Gregorian calendar did not, the Julian calendar fell one day further behind, bringing the difference to 13 days until February 28 (O.S. February 15), 2100. The year 1900 also marked the Year of the Rat on the Chinese calendar.

Events

January 

 January 2 – U.S. Secretary of State John Hay announces the Open Door Policy, to promote American trade with China.
 January 3 – The United States Census estimates the country's population to be about 70 million people.
 January 5 – Dr. Henry A. Rowland of Johns Hopkins University announces a theory about the cause of the Earth's magnetism.
 January 6 – Second Boer War: Boers attempt to end the Siege of Ladysmith, which leads to the Battle of Platrand.
 January 9 - The first through passenger train goes from Cairo to Khartoum.
 January 14
 Puccini's opera Tosca premieres in Rome, Italy.
 The U.S. Senate accepts the British-German Treaty of 1899, in which the United Kingdom renounces its claims to the American Samoa portion of the Samoan Islands.

 January 24 – Second Boer War – Battle of Spion Kop: Boer troops defeat the British Army.

 January 27 – Boxer Rebellion: Foreign diplomats in Peking, Qing Dynasty China, demand that the Boxer rebels be disciplined.
 January 31 – Datu Muhammad Salleh, leader of the Mat Salleh Rebellion in North Borneo, is shot dead in Tambunan.

February 

 February 5 – The United Kingdom and the United States sign a treaty for the building of a Central American shipping canal across Central America in Nicaragua.
 February 6 – The International Arbitration Court at The Hague is created, when the Netherlands' Senate ratifies an 1899 peace conference decree.
 February 8 – Second Boer War: British troops defeat the Boers at Ladysmith, South Africa.
 February 14 – Second Boer War: Battle of Paardeberg – 20,000 British troops invade the Orange Free State.
 February 15 – Second Boer War: The Siege of Kimberley is lifted.
 February 16 – The Southern Cross expedition led by Carsten Borchgrevink achieved a new Farthest South of 78° 50'S, making the first landing at the Great Ice Barrier.
 February 17 – Second Boer War: Battle of Paardeberg – British troops defeat the Boers.
 February 27
 The British Labour Party is officially established, at a meeting in the Congregational Memorial Hall in London, and Ramsay MacDonald is appointed as its first secretary.
 Second Boer War: British military leaders accept the unconditional notice of surrender from Boer General Piet Cronjé.
 FC Bayern, Germany's most successful football club, is founded in Munich.

March 

 March 5 – Two U.S. Navy cruisers are sent to Central America to protect American interests in a dispute between Nicaragua and Costa Rica.
 March 6 – A coal mine explosion in West Virginia, United States, kills 50 miners.
 March 14
Botanist Hugo de Vries rediscovers Mendel's Laws of Heredity.
The Gold Standard Act is ratified, placing the United States currency on the gold standard.
 March 16 – British archaeologist Sir Arthur Evans purchases the land on Crete on which the ruins of the Palace of Knossos stand. He begins to unearth some of the palace three days later.
 March 18 – AFC Ajax, a successful football club in Netherlands, is founded in Amsterdam.
 March 23 – Dr. Karl Landsteiner first reports his discovery of an accurate means for classifying a system of blood type, which will universally be referred to as the ABO blood group system and for which he will be awarded the Nobel Prize in Physiology or Medicine in 1930.
 March 27 – The arrival of a Russian naval fleet in Korea causes concern to the Imperial Japanese government.

April 

 April 14 – The Exposition Universelle, a world's fair, opens in Paris.
 April 22 – Battle of Kousséri: French forces secure their domination of Chad. Warlord Rabih az-Zubayr is defeated and killed.

May 

 May – American explorer Robert Peary is the first person to sight Kaffeklubben Island.
 May 1 – Scofield Mine disaster: An explosion of blasting powder in a coal mine in Scofield, Utah, United States, kills 200 people.
 May 14 – The second Olympic Games, Paris 1900, open (as part of the Paris World Exhibition).
 May 17
 Second Boer War: The British Army relieves the Siege of Mafeking.
 Boxer Rebellion: Boxers destroy three villages near Peking, and kill 60 Chinese Christians.
 L. Frank Baum's The Wonderful Wizard of Oz is published in Chicago, the first of Baum's Oz books, chronicling the fictional Land of Oz for children.
 May 18 – The United Kingdom proclaims a protectorate over Tonga.
 May 21 – Russia invades Manchuria.
 May 24 – Second Boer War: The British annex the Orange Free State, as the Orange River Colony.
 May 28 – Boxer Rebellion: The Boxers attack Belgians, in the Fengtai railway station.
 May 29 – N'Djamena, the capital city of Chad, is founded as Fort-Lamy, by French commander Émile Gentil.
 May 31 – Boxer Rebellion: Peacekeepers from various European countries arrive in China, where they join with Japanese forces.

June 

 June 1 – American temperance agitator Carrie Nation begins her crusade to demolish saloons.
 June 5 – Second Boer War: British soldiers take Pretoria.
 June 14 – The Reichstag approves the second of the German Naval Laws allowing expansion of the Imperial German Navy.
 June 17 – Boxer Rebellion – Battle of Dagu Forts: Naval forces of the Eight-Nation Alliance capture the Taku Forts, on the Hai River estuary in China.
 June 20 – Boxer Rebellion: Boxers gather about 20,000 people near Peking, and kill hundreds of European citizens, including the German ambassador.
 June 25 – The Taoist monk Wang Yuanlu discovers the Dunhuang manuscripts, a cache of ancient texts that are of great historical and religious significance, in the Mogao Caves of Dunhuang, China, where they have been sealed since the early 11th century.
The fire engulfs the adjacent piers and nearby ships, killing 326 people.

July 

 July 2 – The first zeppelin flight is carried out over Lake Constance, near Friedrichshafen, Germany.
 July 23–25 – The First Pan-African Conference is held in London.
 July 29 – King Umberto I of Italy is assassinated by Italian-born anarchist Gaetano Bresci in Monza.

August 

 August — The first Michelin Guide is published in France.
 August 14 – Boxer Rebellion: An international contingent of troops, under British command, invades Peking and frees the European hostages.

September 

 September 8 – The 1900 Galveston hurricane kills about 6,000–12,000 people.
 September 12 – Admiral Fredrik von Otter becomes Prime Minister of Sweden.
 September 13 – Philippine–American War – Battle of Pulang Lupa: Filipino resistance fighters defeat a detachment of American soldiers.
 September 17 – Philippine–American War – Battle of Mabitac: Filipinos under Juan Cailles defeat the Americans, under Colonel Benjamin F. Cheatham.

October 

 October 9 – The Cook Islands become a territory of the United Kingdom.
 October 19 – Max Planck discovers the law of black-body radiation (Planck's law), by introducing the notion of light quanta, leading in 1905 to Albert Einstein's explanation of the photoelectric effect and beginning the Quantum Revolution.
 October 25 – The United Kingdom annexes the Transvaal.

November

 November 6 – 1900 United States presidential election: Republican incumbent William McKinley is reelected by defeating Democratic challenger William Jennings Bryan in a rematch.
 November 29 – Herbert Kitchener succeeds Frederick Roberts as commander-in-chief of the British forces in South Africa and implements a scorched earth strategy.

December 

 December 14 – Max Planck announces his discovery of the law of black body emission, marking the birth of quantum physics.
 December 19 – Hopetoun Blunder: The first Governor-General of Australia John Hope, 7th Earl of Hopetoun, appoints Sir William Lyne premier of the new state of New South Wales, but he is unable to persuade other colonial politicians to join his government, and is forced to resign.
 December 27 – British human rights activist Emily Hobhouse arrives in Cape Town, South Africa.

Date unknown 
 Australasian prospector Albert Fuller Ellis identifies phosphate deposits on the Pacific Islands of Nauru and Banaba Island (Ocean Island).
 In New Haven, Connecticut, U.S., Louis Lassen of Louis' Lunch makes the first modern-day hamburger sandwich.
 Four out of every 1,000 residents of British India die of cholera each year.

Births

January 

 January 1
 Mieczysław Batsch, Polish footballer (d. 1977)
 Paola Borboni, Italian film actress (d. 1995)
 Xavier Cugat, Cuban bandleader (d. 1990)
 Hub van Doorne, Dutch businessman (d. 1979)
 Chiune Sugihara, Japanese diplomat, saved Jewish WWII refugees (d. 1986)
 January 2
 William Haines, American actor (d. 1973)
 Mansaku Itami, Japanese film director (tuberculosis) (d. 1946)
 Józef Klotz, Polish footballer (d. 1941)
 Una Ledingham, British physician, known for research on diabetes in pregnancy (d. 1965)
 January 3
Maurice Jaubert, French composer and soldier (d. 1940)
 Ernst Neubach, Austrian screenwriter, producer, and director (d. 1968)
 January 4
 James Bond, American ornithologist (d. 1989)
 William Young, British World War I veteran (d. 2007)
 January 5
 George Magrill, American film actor (d. 1952)
 Yves Tanguy, French painter (d. 1955)
 January 6
 Queen Maria of Yugoslavia (1922-1934) (d. 1961)
 John Sinclair, American actor (d. 1945)
 Emmanuel d'Astier de La Vigerie, French journalist and politician (d. 1969)
 January 8
 Dorothy Adams, American character actress (d. 1988)
 François de Menthon, French politician, professor of law (d. 1984)
 January 9 – Richard Halliburton, American adventurer and writer (d. 1939)
 January 10 – Jean Gehret, Swedish actor and director (d. 1956)
 January 11 – Lloyd French, American film director (d. 1950)
 January 13 – Shimizugawa Motokichi, Japanese sumo wrestler (d. 1967)
 January 16 
 Kiku Amino, Japanese author, translator (d. 1978)
 Edith Frank, German-Dutch mother of Anne Frank (d. 1945)
 January 18 – Wan Laiming, Chinese animator (d. 1997)
 January 20
 Dorothy Annan, English painter, potter, and muralist (d. 1983)
 Colin Clive, British actor (d. 1937)
 January 22
Ernst Busch, German singer and actor (d. 1980)
 René Pellos, French artist (d. 1998)
 January 23 – William Ifor Jones, Welsh conductor, organist (d. 1988)
 January 24 – Theodosius Dobzhansky, Ukrainian geneticist, evolutionary biologist (d. 1975)
 January 26 – Karl Ristenpart, German conductor (d. 1967)
 January 27 – Hyman G. Rickover, American admiral (d. 1986)
 January 28 – Rajagopala Tondaiman, King of Pudukkottai (d. 1950)
 January 30 – Martita Hunt, Argentine-born British actress (d. 1969)
 January 31 – Betty Parsons, American artist, art dealer and collector (d. 1982)

February 

 February 2
 Anni Frind, German lyric soprano (d. 1987)
 Józef Kowalski, Polish supercentenarian, one of the last surviving veterans of the Polish–Soviet War (d. 2013)
 February 4 – Jacques Prévert, French lyricist and author (d. 1977)
 February 5 – Adlai Stevenson, American politician (d. 1965)
 February 11 
 Ellen Broe, Danish nurse, pioneer in nursing education (d. 1994)
 Hans-Georg Gadamer, German philosopher (d. 2002)
 Jōsei Toda, Japanese educator and activist (d. 1958)
 February 12
 Vasily Chuikov, Marshal of the Soviet Union during WWII (d. 1982)
 Roger J. Traynor, American judge (d. 1983)
 February 13 – Barbara von Annenkoff, Russian-born German film and stage actress (d. 1979)
 February 21
 Józef Adamek, Polish footballer (d. 1974)
 Jeanne Aubert, French singer and actress (d. 1988)
 February 22 – Luis Buñuel, Spanish film director (d. 1983)
 February 24 – Irmgard Bartenieff, German-American dancer, physical therapist and leading pioneer of dance therapy (d. 1981)
 February 25 
Richard Hollingshead, American inventor of the drive-in theatre (d. 1975)
 Illa Martin, German dendrologist, botanist, conservationist and dentist (d. 1988)
 Madame Satã, Brazilian drag performer and capoeirista (d. 1976)
 February 26 – Halina Konopacka, Polish athlete (d. 1989)
 February 28 – Wolfram Hirth, German pilot and aircraft designer (d. 1959)

March 

 March 2 – Kurt Weill, German-American composer (d. 1950)
 March 3 
Maghfoor Ahmad Ajazi, veteran Indian Independence activist (d. 1966)
Edna Best, British stage and film actress, appeared on early television in 1938 (d. 1974)
 Ruby Dandridge, African-American film, radio actress (d. 1987) 
 March 4 – Herbert Biberman, American screenwriter, film director (d. 1971)
 March 5 
 Lilli Jahn, German-Jewish doctor (d. 1944)
 Johanna Langefeld, German guard, supervisor of three Nazi concentration camps (d. 1974)
 March 7 
 Lorimer Dods, Australian medical pioneer (d. 1981)
 Leslie Hutchinson, Grenada-born cabaret singer (d. 1969)
 Fritz London, German-Jewish physicist (d. 1954) 
 Carel Willink, Dutch painter (d. 1983)
 March 8
 Howard Aiken, American computing pioneer (d. 1973)
 Henry Abel Smith, 17th Governor of Queensland (d. 1993)
 March 9 – Prince Aimone, Duke of Aosta, Italian prince (d. 1948)
 March 10 – Violet Brown, Jamaican supercentenarian, oldest Jamaican ever (d. 2017)
 March 11 
 Hanna Bergas, German teacher who helped rescue Jewish children during WWII (d. 1987)
 Alfredo Dinale, Italian Olympic cyclist (d. 1976)
 March 12
 Rinus van den Berge, Dutch athlete (d. 1972)
 Sylvi Kekkonen, Finnish writer and wife of President of Finland Urho Kekkonen (d. 1974)
 Gustavo Rojas Pinilla, 19th President of Colombia (d. 1975)
 March 13 
 Queen Sālote Tupou III of Tonga, (d. 1965)
 Andrée Bosquet, Belgian painter (d. 1980)
 Giorgos Seferis, Greek poet, recipient of the Nobel Prize in Literature (d. 1971)
 March 16 – Mencha Karnicheva, Macedonian revolutionary, assassin (d. 1964)
 March 17 – Manuel Plaza, Chilean athlete (d. 1969)
 March 18 – Hanne Sobek, German footballer (d. 1989)
 March 19 
 Carmen Carbonell, Spanish stage, film actress (d. 1988)
 Frédéric Joliot-Curie, French physicist, recipient of the Nobel Prize in Chemistry (d. 1958)
 March 20 – Amelia Chopitea Villa, Bolivia's first female physician (d. 1942)
 March 23 – Erich Fromm, German-born psychologist, philosopher who lived in Cuernavaca, Mexico (d. 1980)
 March 26 – Angela Maria Autsch, German nun, died in Auschwitz helping Jewish prisoners (d. 1941)
 March 29
 Sir John McEwen, 18th Prime Minister of Australia (d. 1980)
 Oscar Elton Sette, American fisheries scientist (d. 1972)
 March 30 – Santos Urdinarán, Uruguayan footballer (d. 1979)
 March 31 – Prince Henry, Duke of Gloucester (d. 1974)

April 

 April 1 – Stefanie Clausen, Danish Olympic diver (d. 1981)
 April 3
 Camille Chamoun, 7th president of Lebanon (d. 1987)
 Albert Ingham, English mathematician (d. 1967)
 Albert Walsh, Lieutenant Governor of Newfoundland (d. 1958)
 April 5 
 Josefina Passadori, Argentinian writer and poet (d. 1987)
 Spencer Tracy, American actor (d. 1967)
 April 8 – Marie Byles, Australian solicitor (d. 1979)
 April 10
 Arnold Orville Beckman, American chemist and investor (d. 2004)
 Jean Duvieusart, Belgian politician (d. 1977)
 April 11 – Sándor Márai, Hungarian writer and journalist (d. 1989)
 April 13 – Sorcha Boru, American potter, ceramic sculptor (d. 2006)
 April 14 – Salvatore Baccaloni, Italian operatic bass, buffo artist, and actor. (d. 1969)
 April 16 – Polly Adler, Russian-American author, madam (d. 1962)
 April 18 – Bertha Isaacs, Bahamian teacher, tennis player, politician and women's rights activist (d. 1997)
 April 19
 Iracema de Alencar, Brazilian film actress (d. 1978)
 Rhea Silberta, Yiddish songwriter, singing teacher (d. 1959)
 April 20 – Fred Raymond, Austrian composer (d. 1954)
 April 21 – Hans Fritzsche, German Nazi official (d. 1953)
 April 22 – Nellie Beer, British politician, Lord Mayor of Manchester (1966–67) (d. 1988)
 April 24 – Elizabeth Goudge, English writer (d. 1984)
 April 25 – Wolfgang Pauli, Austrian-born physicist, Nobel Prize laureate (d. 1958)
 April 26
 Roberto Arlt, Argentine writer (d. 1942)
 Eva Aschoff, German bookbinder, calligrapher (d. 1969)
 Charles Francis Richter, American geophysicist, inventor (d. 1985)
 April 27 – August Koern, Estonian statesman, diplomat (d. 1989)
 April 28 
 Alice Berry, Australian activist (d. 1978)
 Maurice Thorez, French Communist leader (d. 1964)
 April 29
 Concha de Albornoz, Spanish feminist, intellectual, exiled during the Spanish Civil War (d. 1972)
 Amelia Best, Australian politician, one of the first women elected to the Tasmanian House of Assembly (d. 1979)
 April 30 
 David Manners, Canadian-American actor (d. 1998)
 Cecily Lefort, English World War II heroine, spy for the SOE (d. 1945)

May 

 May 1 – Ignazio Silone, Italian author (d. 1978)
 May 2 – A. W. Lawrence, British leading authority on classical sculpture and architecture (d. 1991)
 May 5 
 Helen Redfield, American geneticist (d. 1988)
 Harold Tamblyn-Watts, British cartoonist (d. 1999)
 May 6 – Zheng Ji, Chinese nutritionist, biochemist (d. 2010)
 May 9 – Maria Malicka, Polish stage, film actress (d. 1992)
 May 10
 Beryl May Dent, English mathematical physicist (d. 1977)
 Cecilia Payne-Gaposchkin, British-American astronomer, astrophysicist (d. 1979)
 May 11 – Thomas H. Robbins Jr., American admiral (d. 1972)
 May 12 – Helene Weigel, Austrian actress (d. 1971)
 May 13 – Karl Wolff, German SS functionary and war criminal (d. 1984)
 May 14 – Cai Chang, Chinese politician, women's rights activist (d. 1990)
 May 15 – Ida Rhodes, American mathematician, pioneer in computer programming (d. 1986)
 May 22 
 Juan Arvizu, Mexican operatic tenor and bolero vocalist (d. 1985)
 Vina Bovy, Belgian operatic soprano (d. 1983)
 May 23 – Hans Frank, German Nazi official (executed 1946)
 May 24 – Sonia Rosemary Keppel, British baroness, grandmother of Camilla, Queen Consort (d. 1986)
 May 26 – Karin Juel, Swedish singer, actor and writer (d. 1976)
 May 27
 Lotte Toberentz, German overseer of the Nazi Uckermark concentration camp (d. unknown)
 Uładzimir Žyłka, Belarusian poet (d. 1933)
 May 28 – Tommy Ladnier, American jazz trumpeter (d. 1939)
 May 29 – David Maxwell Fyfe, 1st Earl of Kilmuir, British politician, lawyer and judge (d. 1967)
 May 31 – Lucile Godbold, American Olympic athlete (d. 1981)

June 

 June 3
 Adelaide Ames, American astronomer (d. 1932)
 Leo Picard, German-born Israeli geologist (d. 1997)
 June 4 – George Watkins, American baseball player (d. 1970)
 June 5 – Dennis Gabor, Hungarian physicist, Nobel Prize laureate (d. 1979)
 June 7
 Glen Gray, American saxophonist (d. 1963)
 Frederick Terman, American electrical engineer, professor (d. 1982)
 June 8 – Lena Baker, African-American maid executed for capital murder, pardoned posthumously (d. 1945)
 June 11
 Leopoldo Marechal, Argentine writer (d. 1970)
 Carmen Polo, 1st Lady of Meirás, widow of Francisco Franco (d. 1988)
 June 14
 Ruth Nanda Anshen, American writer, editor and philosopher (d. 2003)
 June Walker, American stage, film actress (d. 1966)
 June 15 – Paul Mares, American jazz trumpeter (d. 1949)
 June 17 
 Martin Bormann, German Nazi official (d. 1945)
 Evelyn Irons, Scottish journalist, war correspondent (d. 2000)
 June 18 – Vlasta Vraz, Czech-American relief worker, editor and fundraiser (d. 1989)
 June 21 – Choi Yong-kun, North Korean general, defense minister (d. 1976)
 June 22 
 Russell Vis, American wrestler (d. 1990)
 Henriette Alimen, French paleontologist, geologist (d. 1996)
 June 23 – Blanche Noyes, American aviator, winner of the 1936 Bendix Trophy Race (d. 1981)
 June 24
 Juan Carlos Caballero Vega, Mexican revolutionary (d. 2010)
 Raphael Lemkin, Polish-born international lawyer (d. 1959)
 Bernard D. H. Tellegen, Dutch electrical engineer (d. 1990)
 June 25
 Marta Abba, Italian actress (d. 1988)
 Zinaida Aksentyeva, Ukrainian/Soviet astronomer (d. 1969)
 Georgia Hale, American silent film actress, real estate investor (d. 1985)
 Philip D'Arcy Hart, British medical researcher, pioneer in tuberculosis treatment (d. 2006) 
 Louis Mountbatten, 1st Earl Mountbatten of Burma, born Prince Louis of Battenberg, English naval officer and last Viceroy of India (assassinated) (d. 1979)
 June 26
 John Benham, British long-distance runner (d. 1990)
 Jo Spier, Dutch artist and illustrator (d. 1978)
 June 27 – Dixie Brown, St Lucian-born British boxer (d. 1957)
 June 29 – Antoine de Saint-Exupéry, French pilot, writer (d. 1944)
 June 30 – Alf Ihlen, Norwegian industrialist (d. 2006)

July 

 July 2 
 Joe Bennett, American baseball player (d. 1987)
 Sophie Harris, English costume, scenic designer for theatre and opera (d. 1966)
 July 3 
 Alessandro Blasetti, Italian film director and screenwriter (d. 1987)
 Gordon MacQuarrie, American author and journalist (d. 1956)
 July 4 
 Belinda Dann, indigenous Australian who was one of the Stolen Generation, reunited with family aged 107 (d. 2007)
 Robert Desnos, French poet (d. 1945)
 Nellie Mae Rowe, African-American folk artist (d. 1982)
 July 5 
 Richard K. Webel, American landscape architect (d. 2000)
 Reed Howes, American model (d. 1964)
 July 6 
 Frederica Sagor Maas, American playwright, essayist, and author (d. 2012)
 Paul Métivier, Canadian World War I veteran (d. 2004)
 Elfriede Wever, German Olympic runner (d. 1941)
 July 7 
 Maria Bard, German stage, silent film actress (d. 1944)
 Frank W. Cyr, American educator, author (d. 1995)
 Earle E. Partridge, American general (d. 1990)
 July 9 – Joseph LaShelle, American cinematographer (d. 1989)
 July 10 – Evelyn Laye, English actress (d. 1996)
 July 11 – Lily Eberwein, Sarawakian nationalist, women's rights activist (d. 1980)
 July 13 
 Cornelius Keefe, American actor (d. 1972)
 George Lewis, American jazz clarinetist (d. 1968)
 July 15 – Enrique Cadícamo, Argentine tango lyricist, poet and novelist (d. 1999)
 July 16 – Mumon Yamada, Japanese Rinzai religious leader (d. 1988)
 July 20 – Hunter Lane, American baseball player (d. 1994)
 July 21 – Isadora Bennett, American theatre manager, modern dance publicity agent (d. 1980)
 July 23 
 Julia Davis Adams, American author, journalist (d. 1993)
 John Babcock, last surviving Canadian World War I veteran (d. 2010)
 Inger Margrethe Boberg, Danish folklore researcher, writer (d. 1957)
 Prince Kaya Tsunenori (d. 1978)
 July 26 – Sarah Kafrit, Israeli politician, teacher (d. 1983)
 July 28 – Lady Dorothy Macmillan, spouse of the Prime Minister of the United Kingdom (d. 1966)
 July 29 
 Mary V. Austin, Australian community worker, political activist (d. 1986)
 Eyvind Johnson, Swedish writer, Nobel Prize laureate (d. 1976)
 Teresa Noce, Italian labor leader, activist, and journalist (d. 1980)

August 

 August 3 – Ernie Pyle, American journalist (d. 1945)
 August 4 
 Arturo Umberto Illia, 34th President of Argentina (d. 1983)
 Queen Elizabeth The Queen Mother, queen consort of George VI (d. 2002)
 Nabi Tajima, Japanese supercentenarian, last surviving person born in the 19th century (d. 2018)
 August 6
Cecil Howard Green, British-born geophysicist, businessman (d. 2003)
Grigori Shtern, Soviet general (d. 1941)
 August 8 – Alexis Minotis, Greek actor, stage director (d. 1990)
 August 9 – Charles Farrell, American actor (d. 1990)
 August 10 – Arthur Espie Porritt, New Zealand politician, athlete (d. 1994)
 August 11
 Alexander Mosolov, Russian composer (d. 1973)
 Charley Paddock, American sprinter (d. 1943)
 Philip Phillips, American archaeologist (d. 1994)
 August 14
 Margret Boveri, German journalist, recipient of the Order of Merit of the Federal Republic of Germany (d. 1975) 
 Benita von Falkenhayn, German baroness, spy for the Second Polish Republic pre-WWII (d. 1935) 
 August 15 – Estelle Brody, American silent film actress (d. 1995)
 August 16 – Ida Browne, Australian geologist, palaeontologist (d. 1976)
 August 17
Mary Paik Lee, Korean-American writer (d. 1995) 
Vivienne de Watteville, British travel writer and adventurer (d. 1957)
 August 18
 Glenn Albert Black, American archaeologist (d. 1964)
 Ruth Norman, American religious leader (d. 1993)
 August 19
 Colleen Moore, American actress (d. 1988)
 Gilbert Ryle, British philosopher (d. 1976)
 Dorothy Burr Thompson, American archaeologist, art historian (d. 2001)
 August 22
 Lisy Fischer, Swiss-born pianist, child prodigy (d. 1999)
 Sergey Ozhegov, Russian lexicographer (d. 1964)
 August 23 
 Frances Adaskin, Canadian pianist (d. 2001)
 Ernst Krenek, Austrian-American composer (d. 1991)
 August 25 
 Isobel Hogg Kerr Beattie, Scottish architect (d. 1970)
 Sir Hans Adolf Krebs, German physician, biochemist and recipient of the Nobel Prize in Physiology or Medicine (d. 1981)
 August 26 
 Margaret Utinsky, American nurse, recipient of the Medal of Freedom (d. 1970)
 Hellmuth Walter, German engineer, inventor (d. 1980)

September 

 September 3 – Urho Kekkonen, 8th President of Finland (d. 1986)
 September 5 – Grace Eldering, American public health scientist, co-developed vaccine for whooping cough (d. 1988)
 September 6 – W. A. C. Bennett, Canadian politician (d. 1979)
 September 8 – Tilly Devine, English-Australian organised crime boss (d. 1970)
 September 17 
 J. Willard Marriott, American entrepreneur and founder of Marriott International (d. 1985)
 Lena Frances Edwards, African-American physician, awarded the Presidential Medal of Freedom (d. 1986)
 Martha Ostenso, Canadian screenwriter, novelist (d. 1963)
 Hedwig Ross, New Zealand-born educator, political activist and founding member of the Communist Party of New Zealand (d. 1971)
 September 18
 Thomas Darden, American rear admiral, 37th Governor of American Samoa (d. 1961)
 Seewoosagur Ramgoolam, 1st prime minister of Mauritius (d. 1985)
 September 20 – Uuno Klami, Finnish composer (d. 1961)
 September 22 – Paul Hugh Emmett, American chemical engineer (d. 1985)
 September 23 – Louise Nevelson, Ukrainian-born American sculptor (d. 1988)
 September 26 – Suzanne Belperron, French jewellery designer (d. 1983)
 September 27 – Miguel Alemán Valdés, 46th President of Mexico, 1946-1952 (d. 1983)

October 

 October 1 – Tom Goddard, English cricketer (d. 1966)
 October 2 – Olive Ann Alcorn, American dancer, model, and silent film actress (d. 1975)
 October 5
 Bing Xin, Chinese author, poet, known for her contributions to children's literature (d. 1999)
 Margherita Bontade, Italian politician (d. 1992)
 October 6 
 Vivion Brewer, American activist, desegregationist (d. 1991) 
 Stan Nichols, English cricketer (d. 1961)
 October 7 – Heinrich Himmler, German Nazi official, SS head (d. 1945)
 October 10 – Helen Hayes, American actress (d. 1993)
 October 11 - Boris Yefimov, Soviet political cartoonist (d. 2008)
 October 16 – Edward Ardizzone, English painter, printmaker and author (d. 1979)
 October 17 – Jean Arthur, American actress (d. 1991)
 October 18 
 Sarah Bavly, Dutch-Israeli nutritionist, author and educator (d. 1993)
 Evelyn Berckman, American author, known for her detective and Gothic horror novels (d. 1978)
 October 19 
 Erna Berger, German coloratura lyric soprano (d. 1990) 
 Bill Ponsford, Australian cricketer (d. 1991)
 October 20 – Ismail al-Azhari, 2nd Prime Minister of Sudan, 3rd President of Sudan (d. 1969)
 October 21
 Andrée Boisson, French Olympic fencer (d. 1973)
 Princess Mother Srinagarindra of Thailand (d. 1995)
 October 23  – Douglas Jardine, British cricketeer (d. 1958)
 October 25 – Funmilayo Ransome-Kuti, Nigerian suffragist and women's rights activist (d. 1978)
 October 26 
 Ibrahim Abboud, 4th prime minister, 1st president of Sudan (d. 1983)
 Karin Boye, Swedish poet, novelist, known for her dystopian sci-fi novel Kallocain (d. 1941)
 October 30
Ragnar Granit, Finnish neuroscientist, recipient of the Nobel Prize in Physiology or Medicine (d. 1991)
Agustín Lara, Mexican composer and interpreter of songs and boleros (d. 1970)
 October 31 – Asbjørg Borgfelt, Norwegian sculptor (d. 1976)

November 

 November 2 – Carola Neher, German actress and singer (d. 1942)
 November 3 - Adolf Dassler, Cobbler, entrepreneur and inventor who founded Adidas (d. 1978)
 November 4 – Lucrețiu Pătrășcanu, Romanian communist activist, sociologist (d. 1954)
 November 5
 Martin Dies Jr., American politician (d. 1972)
 Natalie Schafer, American actress (d. 1991)
 Ethelwynn Trewavas, British ichthyologist, over a dozen fish species named in her honor (d. 1993)
 November 6 
Ida Lou Anderson, American orator, professor and radio broadcasting pioneer (d. 1941)
 Hugh Prosser, American actor (d. 1952)
 November 8 – Margaret Mitchell, American writer (Gone With The Wind) (d. 1949)
 November 10 – Rudolf Vogel, German film and television actor (d. 1967)
 November 11
 Maria Babanova, Russian stage, film actress (d. 1983)
 Frederick Lawton, 9th Director of the Office of Management and Budget (d. 1975)
 November 13
 David Marshall Williams, American inventor (d. 1975)
 Samuel King Allison, American physicist (d. 1965)
 November 14 – Aaron Copland, American composer (d. 1990)
 November 16
 Eliška Junková, Czechoslovakian automobile racer (d. 1994)
 Nikolai Pogodin, Soviet playwright (d. 1962)
 November 19 – Anna Seghers, German writer (d. 1983)
 November 20 
 Florieda Batson, American hurdler, captain of the United States team at the 1922 Women's Olympics (d. 1996)
 Helen Bradley, English painter (d. 1979)
 November 21 – Bettina Warburg, German-American psychiatrist, professor (d. 1990)
 November 22 – Tom Macdonald, Welsh journalist, novelist (d. 1980)
 November 25 – Rudolf Höß, German Nazi official (d. 1947)
 November 26 – Anna Maurizio, Swiss biologist, known for her study of bees (d. 1993)
 November 27 – Jovette Bernier, Canadian journalist, author, and radio show host (d. 1981)
 November 28 – Mary Bothwell, Canadian classical vocalist, painter (d. 1985)
 November 29
 Mildred Gillars, American broadcaster (Axis Sally), employed by Nazi Germany to disseminate propaganda during WWII (d. 1988)
 Håkan Malmrot, Swedish swimmer (d. 1987)
 November 30 – Luigi Stipa, Italian aeronautical, hydraulic, and civil engineer and aircraft designer (d. 1992)

December 

 December 2
 Elisa Godínez Gómez de Batista, First Lady of Cuba (1940-1944) (d. 1993)
 Herta Hammerbacher, German landscape architect, professor (d. 1985)
 December 3
 Karna Maria Birmingham, Australian artist, illustrator and print maker (d. 1987)
 Ulrich Inderbinen, Swiss mountain guide (d. 2004)
 Richard Kuhn, Austrian chemist, Nobel Prize laureate (d. 1967)
 December 6 – Agnes Moorehead, American actress, best known for her role in Bewitched (d. 1974)
 December 7
 Kateryna Vasylivna Bilokur, Ukrainian folk artist (d. 1961)
 Christian Matras, Faroese linguist, poet (d. 1988)
 December 10 – Dominic Costa, Australian politician (d. 1976)
 December 11 – Hermína Týrlová, Czechoslovakian animator, screenwriter, and film director (d. 1993)
 December 12 – Sammy Davis Sr., American dancer (d. 1988)
 December 16 – Rudolf Diels, German Nazi civil servant, Gestapo chief (d. 1957)
 December 17
 Mary Cartwright, British mathematician, one of the first people to analyze a dynamical system with chaos (d. 1998)
 Katina Paxinou, Greek actress (d. 1973)
 December 19 – Margaret Brundage, American illustrator, known for illustrating the pulp magazine Weird Tales (d. 1976)
 December 20 
 Lissy Arna, German film actress (d. 1964)
 Marinus van der Goes van Naters, Dutch politician (d. 2005)
 December 22
 Alan Bush, British composer, pianist and conductor (d. 1995)
 Ofelia Uribe de Acosta, Colombian author, editor, and suffragist (d. 1988)
 December 23 
 Merle Barwis, American-Canadian supercentenarian (d. 2014)
 Marie Bell, French actress, stage director (d. 1985)
 José de León Toral, assassin of Mexican President Álvaro Obregón (d. 1929)
 December 24 
Joey Smallwood, first Premier of Newfoundland & Labrador (d. 1991)
 Hussein Al Oweini, 18th prime minister of Lebanon (d. 1971)
 Hawayo Takata, Japanese-American teacher, master practitioner of Reiki (d. 1980)
 December 25 – Antoni Zygmund, Polish mathematician (d. 1992)
 December 26 – Evelyn Bark, leading member of the British Red Cross, first female recipient of the CMG (d. 1993)

Date unknown 

Robina Addis, early British professional psychiatric social worker (d. 1986)
 Margaret Altmann, German-American biologist, specialist in animal husbandry and psychobiology (d. 1984)
 Juanita Ángeles, Filipina silent film actress (d. unknown)
 Hattie Moseley Austin, African-American entrepreneur, restaurateur (d. 1998)
 Louella Ballerino, American fashion designer, known for her work in sportswear (d. 1978)
 Natalya Bilikhodze, Russian Romanov impostor falsely claiming to be Grand Duchess Anastasia Nikolaevna of Russia (d. 2000) 
 Ruth Bonner, Soviet Communist activist, sentenced to labor camp during Joseph Stalin's Great Purge (d. 1987) 
 Anna Borkowska (Sister Bertranda), Polish nun, prioress who hid 17 Jews in her monastery during WWII (d. 1988)
 Grace Hartman, Canadian social activist, politician, and first female mayor of Sudbury, Ontario (d. 1998)
 Rubén Jaramillo, Mexican peasant leader (d. 1962)
 Daudo Okelo, Ugandan Roman Catholic martyr and saint (b. ca. 1900; d. 1918)
 Bella Reay, English footballer (d. unknown)
 Virginia Frances Sterrett, American artist, illustrator (d. 1931)
 Yung Fung-shee, Hong Kong philanthropist (d. 1972)

Deaths

January–June 

 January 5 – William A. Hammond, American military physician, neurologist, and 11th Surgeon General of the United States Army (1862–1864) (b. 1828)
 January 11 – James Martineau, English religious philosopher (b. 1805) 
 January 16 – S. M. I. Henry, American evangelist (b. 1839)
 January 20 – John Ruskin, English writer, artist, and social critic (b. 1819)
 January 31 – John Douglas, 9th Marquess of Queensberry, Scottish nobleman, boxer (b. 1844)
 February 18 – Clinton L. Merriam, American politician (b. 1824)
 February 23 – William Butterfield, British architect (b. 1814)
 March 6
 Carl Bechstein, German piano maker (b. 1826)
 Gottlieb Daimler, German inventor, automotive pioneer (b. 1834)
 March 7 – Rachel Lloyd, American chemist (b. 1839)
 March 10 – Johan Peter Emilius Hartmann, Danish composer (b. 1805)
 March 18 – Hjalmar Kiærskou, Danish botanist (b. 1835)
 March 28 – Piet Joubert, Boer politician, military commander (b. 1834)
 March 29 – Cyrus K. Holliday, cofounder of Topeka, Kansas, 1st president of the Atchison, Topeka and Santa Fe Railway (b. 1826)
 April 2 – Gustaf Åkerhielm, 6th prime minister of Sweden (b. 1833)
 April 5
 Joseph Bertrand, French mathematician (b. 1822)
 Maria Louise Eve, American author (b. 1848)
 Osman Nuri Pasha, Ottoman military leader (b. 1832)
 April 7 – Frederic Edwin Church, American landscape painter (b. 1826)
 April 12 – James Richard Cocke, American physician, homeopath, and pioneer hypnotherapist (b. 1863)
 April 17 – George Curry, Wild West robber (Wild Bunch) (shot) (b. 1871)
 April 19 – James Dawson, Australian activist (b. 1806) 
April 21 – Vikramatji Khimojiraj, Indian ruler (b. 1819)
 April 22 – Amédée-François Lamy, French soldier (b. 1858) (killed in battle)
 April 24 – George Campbell, 8th Duke of Argyll, British politician (b. 1823)
 April 30 – Casey Jones, American railway engineer (b. 1864)
 May 1 – Mihály Munkácsy, Hungarian painter (b. 1844)
 May 2 – Seweryn Morawski, Roman Catholic prelate (b. 1819)
 May 9 – Carit Etlar (Carl Brosbøll), Danish author (b. 1816)
 May 18 – Félix Ravaisson-Mollien, French philosopher (b. 1813)
 May 28 – Sir George Grove, English music writer (b. 1820)
 June 2 – Samori Ture, West African empire-builder (b. 1830)
 June 3 – Mary Kingsley, English explorer, writer (b. 1862)
 June 5 – Stephen Crane, American author (b. 1871)
 June 11 – Belle Boyd, American Confederate spy, actress (b. 1843)
 June 19 – Princess Josephine of Baden (b. 1813)

July–December 

 July 5 – Henry Barnard, American educationalist (b. 1811)
 July 8 – Henry D. Cogswell, American philanthropist (b. 1820)
 July 9 – Gregorio Grassi, Italian Franciscan friar, Roman Catholic martyr and saint (b. 1833)
 July 26 – Nicolae Crețulescu, 2-time prime minister of Romania (b. 1812)
 July 29 – King Umberto I of Italy (assassinated) (b. 1844)
 July 30 – Alfred, Duke of Saxe-Coburg and Gotha, second son of Queen Victoria (b. 1844)
 August 1 – Rafael Molina Sanchez, Spanish bullfighter (b. 1841)
 August 4 – Étienne Lenoir, Belgian engineer (b. 1822)
 August 7 – Wilhelm Liebknecht, German Social Democratic politician (b. 1826)
 August 8 
 Emil Škoda, Czech engineer and industrialist (b. 1839)
 József Szlávy, 6th prime minister of Hungary (b. 1818)
 August 10 – Charles Russell, Baron Russell of Killowen, Lord Chief Justice of England (b. 1832)
 August 12 – Wilhelm Steinitz, Austrian-born chess player, first undisputed World Champion (b. 1836)
 August 13 – Vladimir Solovyov, Russian philosopher and poet (b. 1853)
 August 16 – José Maria de Eça de Queirós, Portuguese writer (b. 1845)
 August 23 – Kuroda Kiyotaka, Japanese politician, 2nd Prime Minister of Japan (b. 1840)
 August 25 – Friedrich Nietzsche, German philosopher, writer (b. 1844)
 September 5 – Arthur Sewall, American politician, industrialist (b. 1835)
 September 19 – Belle Archer, American actress (b. 1859)
 September 23
 William Marsh Rice, American philanthropist, university founder (b. 1816)
 Arsenio Martínez-Campos, Spanish general, revolutionary, and Prime Minister of Spain (b. 1831)
 September 29 – Samuel Fenton Cary, American politician (b. 1814)
 October 15 – Zdeněk Fibich, Czech composer (b. 1850)
 October 19 – Sir Roderick Cameron, Canadian shipping magnate (b. 1825)
 October 22 – John Sherman, American politician (b.1823)
 October 28 – Max Müller, German philologist, Orientalist (b. 1823)
 November 22 – Sir Arthur Sullivan, English composer (b. 1842)
 November 26 – Méry Laurent, French artist's muse, model (b. 1849)
 November 30 – Oscar Wilde, Irish writer (b. 1854)
 December 4 – Aquileo Parra, 11th President of Colombia (b. 1825)
 December 14 – Paddy Ryan, Irish-American boxer, former world's heavyweight champion (b. 1851)
 December 21 – Leonhard Graf von Blumenthal, Prussian field marshal (b. 1810)

World population 
 World population: 1,640,000,000
 Africa: 133,000,000
 Asia: 947,000,000
 Japan: c. 45,000,000
 Europe: 408,000,000
 Latin America: 74,000,000
 Northern America: 82,000,000
 Oceania: 6,000,000

References

Further reading
 Appletons' annual cyclopaedia and register of important events...1900 (1901), vast compendium of data; global coverage online edition
 Gilbert, Martin. A History of the Twentieth Century 1900-1933, Vol. 1 (1997) pp 7–35; global coverage of politics, diplomacy and warfare.
 Herbert C. Fyfe, Pearson's Magazine, July 1900: "How Will The World End?"